Loftus Henry Bland  (August 1805 – 21 January 1872) was an Irish Liberal, Whig and Independent Irish Party politician.

Born in Blandsfort House, Queen's County, Ireland, and the third son of John Bland and Elizabeth née Birch, daughter of Robert Birch, Bland was educated at Trinity College, Cambridge, where he graduated as a Bachelor of Arts in 1825, and a Master of Arts in 1829. He was called to the Irish Bar in 1829, becoming a member of the Queen's Counsel in 1854.

In 1840, he married Charlotte Elizabeth Grove Annesley, daughter of Arthur Grove Annesley and Elizabeth née Mahon, and they had at least one child: John Loftus Bland (1841–1908). After Charlotte's death in 1842, he remarried to Annie Jane Hackett, daughter of John Prendergast Hackett, in 1843, and they had at least three children: Thomas Dalrymple Bland (1846–1869); Elizabeth Emily Bland (died 1901); and Annie Sophia Alicia Bland.

He became an Independent Irish Party Member of Parliament (MP) for King's County at the 1852 general election and, becoming a Whig in 1857, held the seat until 1859, when he unsuccessfully stood as a Liberal.

In 1862, Bland became chairman of the County Cavan Quarter Sessions. He died in Dublin in 1872.

Arms

References

External links
 

UK MPs 1852–1857
Irish Nationalist politicians
Whig (British political party) MPs for Irish constituencies
1805 births
1872 deaths
19th-century King's Counsel
Irish barristers
Irish Queen's Counsel
Alumni of Trinity College, Cambridge
Politicians from County Laois
UK MPs 1857–1859
Members of the Parliament of the United Kingdom for King's County constituencies (1801–1922)